Rövsvett is a hardcore punk rock band from Sweden. It was formed in 1983 in Tranås, Jönköping County. The name is approximately translated as "Ass sweat".

Their records were released mostly by labels Birdnest Records, Bucho Discos, Just4Fun Records, and SixWeeks Records.

Discography

Albums
Hunden beskyddar människan men vem beskyddar hunden?? (Röv tapes) (1984) (cassette)
Afflicted cries in the darkness of war w/Anticimex, Crude S.S.&Fear Of War. (New Face Records) (1986)
Sällan studsar en termos Split-LP w/Plague (Punish Records) (1988)
Fatal farts (Birdnest Records) (1993)
Den falske kakaoinspektören (Birdnest Records) (1994)
Burn the gay nuns (Birdnest Records) (1996)
All makt åt mig (Birdnest Records) (1998)
Kick Ass (Six Weeks Records) (2001)
Thithma Karin (Six Weeks Records) (2003)
Boll-Mats bjuder på bullkalas&kaffe 1984-1987 (Six Weeks Records) (2005)
Sorgedödaren (Six Weeks Records)(2008)

EPs
Jesus var en Tomte (Röv Records) (1985)
Ett psykiskt drama i 7 akter (Röv Records) (1986)
Split 7" med Raped Teenagers (C.B.R./Chicken Brain Records) (1990)
Lepra Cliff (Jesus Kudd Records) (1991)
4 nedräkningen (Birdnest Records) (1994)
Rövsvett i nacken (PAS-83) (2000)
Split 7" med Fett (Big Nose Production) (2002)
The Dwarf (Bucho Discos) (2003)
Kängor&shorts (Bucho Discos) (2004)
Hunden beskyddar människan men vem beskyddar hunden?? (Just4Fun Records) (2013)
Split 7" med Poison Idea (Just4Fun Records) (2015)
Ryssen kommer (Just4Fun Records) (2015)

References

External links
Rovsvett @ Facebook

Swedish punk rock groups
Jönköping County
Musical groups established in 1983